Government Arts College, Salem, is an autonomous college in Salem, Tamil Nadu, India.

History

Anglo-Vernacular School (1857-79) 
The college was originally established as an Anglo-Vernacular School in 1857 by Alexander John Arbuthnot and converted into District School (Zillah High School) with 195 students. The school functioned in a rented building till 1863, then it moved to its own building, constructed in collaboration with public subscription and Government grant. In 1864 the school sent its first batch of students to the Matriculation Examination conducted by the University of Madras.

Affiliate College (1879-85) 
In March 1879, the school was upgraded to a second grade college affiliated to the University of Madras. Seven students from the college attended First Arts Examination held in 1880-81.

Salem Municipal College (1885-1960) 
In October 1885, the college was undertaken by Salem Municipal Council and was named as Salem Municipal College.

In 1928, the college was shifted to the present location after purchasing 11 acres of land near Maravaneri.

On 29 June 1931, P. T. Rajan, then minister in the B. Munuswamy Naidu ministry of the erstwhile Madras Presidency, laid the foundation stone for the clock tower block (near the north end of the campus). The block was built at the cost of ₹.1,50,000, and was opened on 24 November 1932 by Radhabai Subbarayan, the Zamindarini of Kumaramangalam.

In 1944, the college was upgraded to a first grade college.

During his tenure as Salem Municipal Chairman (1941–47), P. Rathinaswami Pillai constructed a second building in the campus with subscriptions and donations received from the public and other institutions.. Consequently, the student strength increased from 408 to 1008.

Students of the 1950-51 batch established a bust in memory of A.Ramasamy, the sixth principal of the college (during 1923-50). It was unveiled on 16 September 1951 by S.G. Manavala Ramanujam, then Vice Chancellor of Annamalai University.

Government Arts College (1960-present) 
The Government of Madras (now Tamil Nadu) took over the college from 1 April 1960 onwards.

In 1976, a two-storey building was built in the campus at the cost of ₹.9,11,000 for the departments of Geography Physics and Zoology.

From 1983, non-semester system was followed.

From 1998-99, the college became a co-educational institution.

The present semester pattern was introduced from 1999-2000.

In 2000, the college received a three-star rating from the National Assessment and Accreditation Council (NAAC).

In 2006, the NAAC re-evaluated the college and rated it 'B ++'.

The college gained autonomous status in 2007. Since then, the old method of examination was replaced by an alternative system with internal marks in semester system.

In accordance with the order of the State government, shift system was introduced in the year 2007-08 and the second shift classes started functioning in departments like Maths, Computer Science, Tamil, English, Commerce, History and Co-Operation.

In 2018, the NAAC re-accredited the college with 'B' status.

In 2019, the University Grants Commission (UGC) extended the college's autonomous status till 2023-24.

List of Principals

Key 

  Died in Office

Academic programmes
The college offers undergraduates and postgraduate programmes in arts and science streams. It has been accredited by NAAC and operates autonomously under the Periyar University.

Departments

Notable faculty 

 G. Devaneya Pavanar (1902-1981):  Professor of Tamil during 1944-1956

Notable alumni 

 Perunchithiranar (1933-1995):  Tamil poet and Tamil nationalist ; B.A. Tamil
 Kolathur Mani (b. 1948): President of Dravidar Viduthalai Kazhagam (DVK) ; Pre-university course (1964-65)

 P. Dhanapal (b.1951): Former Speaker of the Tamil Nadu Legislative Assembly ; B.A. History.
 Brammarajan (b.1953): Tamil poet, translator, essayist, critic and editor ;  B.A. English.
 Saravanan (b.1966): Tamil actor ; B.A. Tamil.

References

External links

Educational institutions established in 1857
1857 establishments in India
Colleges affiliated to Periyar University
Education in Salem, Tamil Nadu
Academic institutions formerly affiliated with the University of Madras